Clinical Nurse Specialist: The Journal for Advanced Nursing Practice is a bimonthly peer-reviewed nursing journal for clinical nurse specialists.

See also
 List of nursing journals

Lippincott Williams & Wilkins academic journals
English-language journals
General nursing journals
Bimonthly journals
Publications established in 1987